The Panel for Educational Policy of the Department of Education of the City School District of the City of New York, abbreviated as the Panel for Educational Policy and also known as the New York City Board of Education, is the governing body of the New York City Department of Education. The members of the board are appointed by the mayor, by the five borough presidents and one each elected by the five borough's CEC presidents.

History

Independent Board (1842–2002) 
The New York State legislature established the New York City Board of Education in 1842.

Mayoral Control (2002–present) 
On June 30, 2002, Mayor Bloomberg secured authority over the schools from the New York State legislature, which began the era of "mayoral control" over the city schools. The New York Supreme Court elaborates:

On June 30, 2009, the New York State Senate declined to renew the mayor's full authority over the school system.  In particular, State Senate Democratic leader John Sampson, of Brooklyn, opposed the extension of mayoral control.  The authority reverted for a time to the Board of Education, but mayoral control was restored until 2015 in a vote on August 6, 2009. The actual city agency running the schools remains the New York City Department of Education.

On January 29, 2021, two days after the January 27, 2021 panel meeting, Borough President James Oddo pulled Peter Calandrella, the Staten Island Representative to the Panel for Educational Policy, who was appointed to back in 2016, due to the fact that Mr. Calandrella voted against a contract extension for the administration of the controversial City Gifted & Talented exam. The borough president's statement mentioned the removal of Peter Calandrella was "not because of the substance of the vote, but because it went against what he, his staff and Calandrella had agreed on the night before". A letter from the entire panel was sent to Borough President Oddo requesting him to change his decision to remove Peter Calandrella from the PEP, however the removal was scheduled to be conducted on February 9, 2021. On March 9, 2021, it was announced that Borough President Oddo had appointed Jaclyn Tacoronte, a local business owner, to replace Peter Calandrella.

Members
There are 23 members of the panel. Each of the five borough presidents appoints one member, every borough's CEC presidents elect one member each, and the remaining thirteen are appointed by the mayor. The chancellor is an ex-officio on the panel and with no voting power along with the student representatives on the panel.

Voting Members 
 Aaron Bogad (Staten Island Borough president appointee)
 Alan Ong (Mayoral appointee)
 Anita Garcia (Mayoral appointee)
 Anthony Giordano (Mayoral appointee)
 Chantel Cabrera (Staten Island CEC Presidents’ representative)
 Dr. Angela Green (Mayoral appointee)
 Ephraim Zakry (Queens CEC Presidents’ representative)
 Geneal Chacon (Bronx Borough president appointee)
 Gladys Ward (Mayoral appointee)
 Gregory Faulkner (Mayoral appointee)
 Jessamyn Lee (Brooklyn CEC Presidents’ representative)
 Dr. Kaliris Salas-Ramirez (Manhattan Borough president appointee)
 Khari Edwards (Mayoral appointee)
Lily Chan (Mayoral appointee)
Maisha Sapp (Mayoral appointee)
Maria Kenley (Mayoral appointee)
Marjorie Dienstag (Mayoral appointee)
Michelle Joseph (Mayoral appointee)
Naveed Hasan (Manhattan CEC Presidents’ representative)
Phoebe Sade-Arnold (Mayoral appointee)
Sheree Gibson (Queens Borough president appointee)
Tazin Azad (Brooklyn Borough president appointee)
 Thomas Sheppard (Bronx CEC Presidents’ representative)

Non-Voting Members 

 David C. Banks, Chancellor

Analysis and criticism
In 2011, Panel for Educational Policy member Patrick Sullivan (who was appointed by then Manhattan Borough President Scott Stringer in 2007)
suggested changing the system to have only six mayoral appointees, and that appointees should have fixed terms; additionally, he stated "For us not to have the same role in our kids' education as people who live in the suburbs or Middle America is patronizing."

See also

 Samuel A. Lewis, elected a member in 1868

References
Notes

External links
 New York City Board of Education/New York City Department of Education (Archive)
 Archives in 1998

Public education in New York City
New York City Department of Education
